Midnight Phantom is a 1935 American film directed by Bernard B. Ray.

Plot summary

Cast 
Reginald Denny as Prof. David Graham
Claudia Dell as Diana Sullivan (misspelled Diane Sullivan in opening credits)
Lloyd Hughes as Police Lt. Dan Burke
Jim Farley as Police Chief James A. Sullivan
Barbara Bedford as Kathleen Ryan
Mary Foy as Mary Ryan
John Elliott as Capt. Bill Withers
Francis Sayles as Police Surgeon Kelly
Al St. John as Radio Officer Jones
Henry Roquemore as Dr. McNeil
Lee Prather as Police Capt. Perkins
Robert Walker as Police Capt. Jim Phillips
Jack Kenny as Police Inspector Silverstein

Soundtrack

References

External links 

1935 films
1930s mystery thriller films
American mystery thriller films
American black-and-white films
1930s romance films
American multilingual films
Films directed by Bernard B. Ray
Reliable Pictures films
American romantic thriller films
1935 multilingual films
1930s English-language films
1930s American films